USS Redhead is a name used more than once by the United States Navy:

 , a coastal minesweeper commissioned 15 December 1944.
 USS Redhead (AM-409), a minesweeper, which was canceled 11 August 1945.

United States Navy ship names